The 2007 Parachinar bombing occurred on 4 August 2007. At least 12 people were killed and more than 43 injured after Ghayor Khan Chamkani, a suicide bomber, detonated a Toyota Corolla near the Eidgah Market and Peshawar bus terminal in Parachinar, the capital city of Kurram Agency and the largest city in the Federally Administered Tribal Areas in northwest Pakistan. The Pakistani Taliban local splinter Sunni militant group claimed responsibility.

References

See also
 Bomb blasts in Parachinar since 2007

2007 murders in Pakistan
2000s crimes in Khyber Pakhtunkhwa
2007 bombing
21st-century mass murder in Pakistan
Attacks on buildings and structures in 2007
2007 bombing
August 2007 crimes
August 2007 events in Pakistan
Building bombings in Pakistan
Marketplace attacks in Asia
2007 bombing
Suicide bombings in 2007
2007
Suicide car and truck bombings in Pakistan
Terrorist incidents in Pakistan in 2007